Shaktikhor is a village development committee in Chitwan District in the Narayani Zone of southern Nepal. At the time of the 1991 Nepal census, it had a population of 4,925 people living in 944 individual households.

References

Populated places in Chitwan District